Kanaka Bar First Nation (Thompson language: T'eqt'aqtn'mux) is a First Nations government located at Kanaka Bar, British Columbia, Canada, between the towns of Boston Bar and Lytton in the Fraser Canyon region.  It is a member of the Fraser Canyon Indian Administration, one of three tribal councils of the Nlaka'pamux people.  Other members of the Fraser Canyon Indian Administration are the Spuzzum, Skuppah and Nicomen First Nations (the Nicomen First Nation is also a member of the Nicola Tribal Association).  Other Nlaka'pamux governments belong either to the Nicola Tribal Association or the Nlaka'pamux Nation Tribal Council.

"Kanaka" was a word used throughout the Pacific islands and Australian to indicate a person recruited for manual labour.  Kanaka also means "free man" but in many cases it meant indentured servant.  Many Hawaiians were employed in the Fraser Canyon.  The presence of many Hawaiians, known in their own language also as kanaka (local guy) on the gold workings on the Fraser in this area conferred the name Kanaka Bar on a certain gold-rich sandbar on the Fraser below.

Treaty Process

History

Reserves
The Kanaka Bar First Nation governs these reserves:
Nekliptum Indian Reserve No. 1
Kanaka Bar Indian Reserve No. 1A
Kanaka Bar Indian Reserve No. 2
Pegleg Indian Reserve No. 3
Pegleg Indian Reserve No. 3A
Whyeek Indian Reserve No. 4

Source: Indian and Northern Affairs Canada First Nations profiles

Demographics

Economic Development

Hydroelectric Projects

The Project will include a water diversion and intake facilities, a buried penstock and a powerhouse located on Kanaka Bar Indian Band's Whyeek IR No. 4 near Lytton.

The developer of the project is Kwoiek Creek Resources Limited Partnership (KCRLP), a partnership between the Kanaka Bar Indian Band ("KBIB") and Innergex Renewable Energy Inc. (Innergex).

KCRLP obtained an Energy Purchase Agreement (EPA) from B.C. Hydro in August 2006. In March 2009, the Project received an Environmental Assessment (EA) Certificate following the completion of a provincial and federal review led by the BC Environmental Assessment Office (BCEAO). The Canadian Environmental Assessment Agency (CEAA) Screening Report was issued in September 2009 and a favourable CEAA decision was made on October 5, 2009. The water licence and crown land tenures were issued in September 2011 and August 2011, respectively. Construction of the access for the Project commenced in June 2011.

Social, Educational and Cultural Programs and Facilities

See also
Kanakas
Nlaka'pamux
Thompson language
Nlaka'pamux Nation Tribal Council
Nicola Tribal Association
Fraser Canyon Indian Administration (tribal council)

Nlaka'pamux governments
First Nations governments in the Fraser Canyon